Hindmarsh Valley is a valley in the Australian state of South Australia.	

Hindmarsh Valley may also refer to 

Hindmarsh Valley, South Australia, a locality
Hindmarsh Valley greenhood, a species of orchid found in South Australia
Hindmarsh Valley Reservoir, a water storage facility in South Australia

See also
Hindmarsh (disambiguation)